Alan Peter Schramm Cayetano (Tagalog pronunciation: [kajɛˈtano]; born October 28, 1970) is a Filipino Singer, lawyer, and diplomat serving as a Senator since 2022 and previously from 2007 to 2017. He was the Senate Minority Leader from 2010 to 2013, and later Senate Majority Leader from 2013 to 2016. He also served as the Representative of Taguig–Pateros from 1998 to 2007 and from 2019 to 2022 and was the Speaker of the House of Representatives from 2019 until his resignation in 2020. He also served as the Secretary of Foreign Affairs from 2017 to 2018 in the cabinet of President Rodrigo Duterte, after unsuccessfully running for vice president in the 2016 elections as Duterte's running mate.

Cayetano was born into and raised in a political family currently based in Taguig. His father was the late former senator Rene Cayetano; his older sister, Pia, is an incumbent senator; his younger brother, Lino, was a former mayor of Taguig; and his wife, Lani, is the current mayor of Taguig and served as the representative of the city's 2nd district. Cayetano was the chairman of the organizing committee for the 2019 Southeast Asian Games. During his time as speaker, one of the most controversial issues was the denial of the franchise renewal of one of the country's biggest media networks, ABS-CBN, due to a number of issues surrounding the said television network.

Early life
Cayetano was born in Mandaluyong to lawyer Renato "Compañero" Cayetano and German-American former school teacher Sandra Schramm. He was raised in Parañaque and moved to Taguig in 1991. Although he inherited United States citizenship by descent, he relinquished his U.S. citizenship in 1998. 

Cayetano resides with his family in Bagumbayan, Taguig. His wife, Lani, is the incumbent Mayor of Taguig and formerly represented the 1st and 2nd districts of Taguig–Pateros. His older sister, Pia, is an incumbent Senator and formerly represented the 2nd district of Taguig at the House of Representatives, where she was also a Deputy Speaker. His youngest brother, Lino, is a film and television director as well as a former congressman and mayor of Taguig, while his other brother Ren is a former councilor of Muntinlupa.

Education

Cayetano completed both his elementary and secondary education at De La Salle Santiago Zobel School. In college, he studied political science at the University of the Philippines Diliman and graduated in 1993. His college days played an important role in his political career. Apart from having a senator as a father, it was in UP where he got his first taste of politics. Just a year after he entered UP Diliman in 1989, he ran for a post in the UP Diliman University Student Council and won.

He then finished his law degree from the Ateneo de Manila University School of Law in 1997, graduating 2nd Honors (silver medalist). Thereafter, he was admitted to the Philippine bar in 1998.

Legislative accomplishments
Most of the laws authored by Cayetano focus on education, persons with disabilities rights, political reforms, health, and environment. Listed below are the laws that he authored and co-authored during his first two terms as a Philippine Senator (2007-2017). 

Republic Act No. 10648 – Iskolar ng Bayan Act of 2014. This provided scholarship grants to top graduates of all public high schools in state-owned universities and colleges. 
Republic Act No. 9500 – University of the Philippines Charter Act of 2008. 
Republic Act No. 10676 – Student-Athletes Protection Act. This law prohibits the commercialization of student-athletes. 
Republic Act No. 7277 – Magna Carta for Disabled Persons. This law provides for the rehabilitation, self-development and self-reliance of disabled persons and their integration into the mainstream society. 
Republic Act No. 10928 – Amendment of the Philippine Passport Act. This extended the validity of the Philippine passport to ten (10) years.

Political career

Councilor of Taguig (1992-1995)
Cayetano, then a junior year college student at University of the Philippines, was elected as councilor of the then-municipality of Taguig in 1992. Elected at the age of 21, he was one of the youngest councilors in the country. He became Taguig's Majority Floor Leader and held various positions, such as the vice-chairperson of the People's Law Enforcement Board.  

From 1992-1993, Cayetano concurrently served as the chairman of the National Capital Region Chapter of the National Movement of Young Legislators.

Vice Mayor of Taguig (1995-1998)
Cayetano was elected vice mayor of Taguig in the 1995 local elections and served for one term.

House of Representatives (1998–2007)
Cayetano ran for the House of Representatives of the Philippines in 1998 as the representative of the lone district of Taguig–Pateros under the Laban ng Makabayang Masang Pilipino. He was the youngest elected representative at the 11th Congress at age 27.

In his first term as a neophyte legislator, Cayetano immediately held major roles and functions, such as being voted as the assistant majority leader. He was also chairman of the Oversight Committee on Bases Conversion and Sub-Committee on New Schools (Committee on Education), and the vice-chairman of the Committee on Suffrage and Electoral Reforms.  

During his second term in the 12th Congress, Cayetano became deputy majority leader and the vice-chairman of the Committee on Rules.  

On his last term in the 13th Congress, he served as the Senior Deputy Minority Leader and an ex officio member of all standing House committees. He also became a fierce critic of then-President Gloria Macapagal Arroyo.

Senate (2007–2017)

Cayetano ran for senator in 2007 under the Genuine Opposition coalition and won, placing 9th out of the 12 seats. He was elected Senate Minority Leader for the 15th Congress in 2010. He was re-elected to the Senate in 2013, running under the Team PNoy administration coalition.

At the start of the 16th Congress in 2013, Cayetano was elected as the new Senate Majority Floor Leader and was likewise appointed to chair the Senate Committee on Rules. He had participated in hearings probing the corruption allegations thrown against then-Vice President Jejomar Binay.

2016 Vice Presidential Campaign

In a press event held in Davao City, Senator Cayetano announced that he would seek election for vice president in the 2016 national elections under the Nacionalista Party, but did not mention who would be his presidential running mate. On November 21, 2015, it was made official that Davao City mayor Rodrigo Duterte would be his running mate for the 2016 presidential elections. Although Duterte won the presidency, Cayetano lost to then-congresswoman Leni Robredo placing third in both unofficial and official vote counts conducted by COMELEC and the Congress, respectively.

Secretary of Foreign Affairs (2017–2018)
On May 10, 2017, President Rodrigo Duterte announced that Cayetano was appointed as Secretary of Foreign Affairs, following the expiration of the one-year appointment ban on losing candidates of the 2016 elections. Cayetano replaced acting secretary Enrique Manalo, who assumed the post in March 2017 when the Commission on Appointments's (CA) rejected President Duterte's ad interim appointment of Perfecto Yasay Jr. due to the latter's citizenship concerns.

His appointment to the post by President Duterte was approved by the CA's foreign affairs committee on May 17, 2017. Upon approval of the CA's plenary, he assumed the post as foreign secretary and effectively resigned from his post as senator. On May 18, Cayetano was sworn in by President Duterte at the Malacañang of the South in Davao City.

As Secretary of Foreign Affairs, Cayetano took an "objective-based" approach in resolving the territorial disputes of the Philippines, which he described as negotiation through the use of historical facts, such as the Treaty of Paris of 1898 and the United Nations Convention on the Law of the Sea, to defend the Philippines' claims. He also vowed to avoid "microphone diplomacy", which he defined as the continual issuing of public statements instead of privately negotiating the issues with the parties.

In January 2018, Filipino Congressman Gary Alejano revealed that the Department of Foreign Affairs Secretary Alan Peter Cayetano had approved the Chinese Institute of Oceanology of the Chinese Academy of Sciences to perform a scientific survey of the Philippine Rise, while disapproving a French research offer in the Rise. Under the agreement, majority of researchers must be Chinese. On the same month, China told Filipino counterparts that the Philippines has no right in the Philippine Rise. Filipino President Rodrigo Duterte's trusted spokesperson Harry Roque embraced and defended China's statement, causing outrage from various Filipino sectors.

In March 2018, Cayetano reiterated that the West Philippine Sea is "disputed", despite a 2016 decision by an international court backed by the United Nations declaring that the Philippines has the sole legal right on the resources of the West Philippine Sea, and which also deemed the Philippines as the internationally acknowledged country with jurisdiction on the area. Cayetano cited the continued conflict over territories, specifically islands, which are not covered by the ruling under the United Nations Convention on the Law of the Sea. Cayetano took the stance that acknowledging the dispute was resolved by the 2016 ruling is not equal to giving up Philippine claims on the territory.

On October 9, 2018, President Duterte announced that Cayetano had planned to run in the May 2019 elections for the post of representative of Taguig–Pateros. He eventually resigned as Foreign Secretary on October 17, the last day of filing of certificates of candidacies. He was succeeded by former Permanent Representative of the Philippines to the United Nations Teodoro Locsin Jr. as Foreign Secretary on the same day.

His and his wife Lani's (running for representative of Taguig's 2nd district) candidacies faced a disqualification case for not possessing the minimum residency qualification and claiming to live in separate residences as indicated on their respective COCs, which is not in accordance with Article 69 of the Family Code. The case was later dismissed on May 7, 2019. The couple later won the elections.

Speaker of the House (2019–2020)

On the first day of the 18th Congress of the Philippines, Cayetano was elected House Speaker after gaining 266 votes against Manila's 6th District Representative Benny Abante, who garnered 28 votes. Cayetano became the 22nd Speaker of the House of Representatives of the Republic of the Philippines on July 22, 2019. He was nominated by Representatives Lord Allan Velasco, Martin Romualdez and presidential son Rep. Paolo Duterte. These three representatives also announced their intention to run for speaker, but President Rodrigo Duterte gave his endorsement to Cayetano.

Cayetano agreed to share his term with Marinduque Representative Lord Allan Velasco, while the 1st District Representative of Leyte, Martin Romualdez, who was among the contenders for the office, agreed to become Majority Floor Leader. The term-sharing agreement was reportedly influenced by President Duterte.

House Speaker Cayetano, in his first speech as speaker, expressed his gratitude to the President and to the members of the House of Representatives for the trust and confidence they bestowed upon him. Cayetano entered the session hall of the House of Representative with a standing ovation and a loud round of applause. After that, a pray-over was led by Rep. Eddie Villanueva. Right after his speech, the Speaker said, "Seek ye first the Kingdom of God, and all will be added unto you."

Under the term-sharing agreement, Cayetano served for 15 months and was followed by Velasco in the remaining months of the 18th Congress of the Philippines.

On September 2, the House designated him as the legislative caretaker of Camarines Sur's 1st district after the elected representative, Marissa Andaya, died of cancer on July 5. On October 16, four days after he resigned as Speaker, the caretaker position was taken over by Michael John Duavit (Rizal–1st).

SEA Games organizing committee
Cayetano chaired the Philippine SEA Games Organizing Committee (PHISGOC), a private organization tasked to organize the 2019 Southeast Asian Games. PHISGOC is a private organization with a budget of  tasked to perform the function of a government office, and shares some of its members with the Philippine Sports Commission.

After the COVID-19 pandemic began, the SEA Games facilities were quickly converted into quarantine facilities a mere four months after the Games concluded.

ABS-CBN franchise renewal controversy
In May 2020, a number of lawmakers blamed Cayetano for the shutdown of ABS-CBN, the Philippines' largest broadcasting network, due to his supposed inaction on several bills seeking to renew the station's franchise. Cayetano pointed to Solicitor General Jose Calida and the National Telecommunications Commission (NTC) for ABS-CBN's subsequent closure, stating "the NTC appears to have succumbed to pressure from the Solicitor General and issued a cease and desist order to ABS-CBN." He warned, "as for the sudden flip-flopping of the NTC and the unconstitutional meddling by the Solicitor General in the business of Congress, I promise you, there will be a reckoning." In July 2020, ABS-CBN's franchise renewal was rejected by the Philippine House Committee on Legislative Franchises of the 18th Congress, which voted 70–11 to deny the application citing political reasons and several issues on the network's franchise. The rejection of the ABS-CBN franchise resulted in a massive retrenchment of its workers, permanent closure of the operations of numerous businesses, and network transfers and resignations by numerous talents. Cayetano and his allies were praised by Solicitor General Calida who claimed victory in silencing ABS-CBN.

In September 2020, Cayetano slammed the European Parliament's resolution urging to grant ABS-CBN a broadcast license because of its "outright interference" in Philippine affairs, claiming that the European Parliament criticized the Philippine government without first asking questions or ascertaining facts.

In his interview for "Hard Talk" with Boy Abunda, he stated, "If it were up to me, ABS-CBN would have been granted a provisional authority valid until October 31, 2020 to give the body more time to deliberate." The provisional authority was based on HB 6732 which Congressman Cayetano filed on May 13, 2020.

House leadership crisis and resignation, BTS sa Kongreso

Cayetano tendered his irrevocable resignation as House Speaker on October 13, 2020, paving the way for Marinduque representative Lord Allan Velasco to assume his position undisputed.

In January 2021, Cayetano formed a new bloc named "BTS sa Kongreso" — short for Balik sa Tamang Serbisyo sa Kongreso — along with fellow lawmakers Mike Defensor, LRay Villafuerte, Dan Fernandez, Raneo Abu, and Jose Antonio Sy-Alvarado.

In late March 2021, Cayetano launched two early political paid advertisements of himself which aired on all major Philippine television networks. One is on the campaign to approve a bill to give  cash aid to every Filipino family, while the other one portrayed Cayetano as an "ideal public servant."

10K Ayuda Bill and initiative
Amid the COVID-19 pandemic, Cayetano and his allies from the BTS bloc filed in February 2021 House Bill 8597 otherwise known as the "10K Ayuda Bill".

In an attempt to prove that the government has the capacity to provide a  cash assistance to every Filipino family, Cayetano launched the Sampung Libong Pag-asa (SLP) program on his Facebook page in May. Through pooled resources from the BTS members and other private donors, the SLP initiative was held almost daily, reaching out to beneficiaries from different sectors across the country. In its daily program via Facebook live, SLP highlights the stories of beneficiaries who said the amount they received helped them rise up from the hardships they encountered when the country was placed under community quarantine. Four months after launching the program, the SLP reached 10,000 beneficiaries nationwide on September 10, 2021. In October, the number of beneficiaries rose to 12,762.

However, the 10K Ayuda Bill failed to be included in the Bayanihan 3 COVID-19 aid package and is still a legislative proposal yet to be acted upon.

Sari-Saring Pag-Asa 
Cayetano introduced the Sari-Saring Pag-asa (SSP) program, which aims to provide struggling sari-sari store owners with a one-time P3,500 cash assistance to replenish their supplies amid the pandemic. An advocate of small to medium enterprise empowerment, Cayetano initiated the program to complement the Sampung Libong Pag-asa program which provides select Filipino families with P10,000 in cash aid to help them with their basic needs and put up their own small businesses amid the pandemic.

SSP takes off from the Taguig Pateros (TaPat) Sari-Store Program created by Taguig 2nd District Rep. Lani Cayetano to provide financial assistance and livelihood training for sari-sari store owners in Taguig and Pateros. The local initiative was later expanded into the Sari-Sari Store Community, a national program that sought to create a community of sharing and mutual aid among sari-sari store owners from different parts of the country. As of October 27, 2021, the SSP program has extended aid to a total of 4,811 sari-sari store owners from different parts of the country.

Senator (2022–present)
On October 7, 2021, Cayetano filed his candidacy for senator as an independent candidate. Earlier, he had hinted that he would 'seriously consider' running for President, wherein his focus would be the passage of the "10K Ayuda Bill" he and his allies from the Balik sa Tamang Serbisyo sa Kongreso (BTS) bloc filed in the lower house. The 10K Ayuda Bill seeks to provide each Filipino household a one-time  cash assistance amid the pandemic.  He also wanted to focus on a five-year economic recovery plan that can be adopted by the presidential candidates.

Cayetano won in the 2022 elections, placing 7th out of the 12 Senate seats up for election. Earning his third Senate term, he was the only winning senator not part of any coalitions. In the 19th Congress, he became part of the Senate independent bloc alongside his sister Pia. Cayetano chairs the Senate Committee on Government Corporations and Public Enterprises and the Senate Committee on Science and Technology.

References

External links 

 

1970 births
Ateneo de Manila University alumni
Alan Peter
Duterte administration cabinet members
Filipino people of American descent
Filipino people of German descent
Filipino diplomats
Independent politicians in the Philippines
Living people
Majority leaders of the Senate of the Philippines
Members of the House of Representatives of the Philippines from Pateros–Taguig
Metro Manila city and municipal councilors
Minority leaders of the Senate of the Philippines
Nacionalista Party politicians
People from Taguig
Politicians from Metro Manila
Candidates in the 2016 Philippine vice-presidential election
Secretaries of Foreign Affairs of the Philippines
Senators of the 14th Congress of the Philippines
Senators of the 15th Congress of the Philippines
Senators of the 16th Congress of the Philippines
Senators of the 17th Congress of the Philippines
Speakers of the House of Representatives of the Philippines
University of the Philippines alumni
People who renounced United States citizenship
Senators of the 19th Congress of the Philippines